Ferenc Temesvári (born 5 January 1916, date of death unknown) was a Hungarian middle-distance runner. He competed in the men's 800 metres at the 1936 Summer Olympics.

References

1916 births
Year of death missing
Athletes (track and field) at the 1936 Summer Olympics
Hungarian male middle-distance runners
Olympic athletes of Hungary
Place of birth missing